The 2018 J&T Banka Prague Open was a professional tennis tournaments played on outdoor clay courts. It was the 9th edition of the tournament, and part of the International category of the 2018 WTA Tour. It took place at the Sparta Prague Tennis Club in Prague, Czech Republic, from 30 April to 5 May 2018.

Points and prize money

Prize money

Singles main draw entrants

Seeds

 Rankings are as of April 23, 2018.

Other entrants
The following players received wildcards into the singles main draw:
  Daria Kasatkina
  Anna Karolína Schmiedlová
  Tereza Smitková

The following players received entry from the qualifying draw:
  Antonia Lottner 
  Elena-Gabriela Ruse
  Patty Schnyder
  Stefanie Vögele

The following players received entry as lucky losers:
  Tamara Korpatsch 
  Jasmine Paolini

Withdrawals 
  Belinda Bencic → replaced by  Océane Dodin
  Varvara Lepchenko → replaced by  Bernarda Pera
  Karolína Plíšková → replaced by  Jasmine Paolini
  Lucie Šafářová → replaced by  Denisa Allertová
  Donna Vekić → replaced by  Richèl Hogenkamp
  Markéta Vondroušová → replaced by  Tamara Korpatsch

Retirements 
  Daria Gavrilova

Doubles main draw entrants

Seeds 

 1 Rankings as of April 23, 2018.

Other entrants 
The following pairs received wildcards into the doubles main draw:
  Viktória Kužmová /  Elena-Gabriela Ruse
  Barbora Štefková /  Barbora Strýcová
The following pair received entry as alternates:
  Misaki Doi /  Cornelia Lister

Withdrawals
Before the tournament
  Raquel Atawo (abductor injury)

During the tournament
  Barbora Strýcová

Finals

Singles

  Petra Kvitová defeated  Mihaela Buzărnescu, 4–6, 6–2, 6–3. 
This was Kvitova's 23rd WTA title and first on home soil. It was also her third title of the year and first International since Linz 2011.

Doubles

  Nicole Melichar /  Květa Peschke defeated  Mihaela Buzărnescu /  Lidziya Marozava, 6–4, 6–2

References

External links 
 Official website

 
J&T Banka Prague Open
J&T Banka
2018